
Gmina Jarosław is a rural gmina (administrative district) in Jarosław County, Subcarpathian Voivodeship, in south-eastern Poland. Its seat is the town of Jarosław, although the town is not part of the territory of the gmina.

Villages
Gmina Jarosław contains the villages and settlements of Koniaczów, Kostków, Leżachów-Osada, Makowisko, Morawsko, Munina, Pełkinie, Sobiecin, Surochów, Tuczempy, Wola Buchowska, Wólka Pełkińska and Zgoda.

Neighbouring gminas
Gmina Jarosław is bordered by the town of Jarosław and by the gminas of Chłopice, Laszki, Pawłosiów, Przeworsk, Radymno, Sieniawa, Tryńcza and Wiązownica.

References

Polish official population figures 2006

Jaroslaw
Jarosław County